Görkem Can (born 4 May 2000) is a professional footballer who plays as a defender. Born in Germany, Can represents Turkey internationally.

Club career
A youth product of VfL Bochum, Can joined the youth academy of Schalke 04 in 2017. On 30 March 2019, he signed his professional contract with Schalke 04, and went on to represent their reserve side.

On 25 January 2020, he signed a 2.5-year contract with the Dutch club Groningen. Almost exactly one year later after a lack of appearances, he transferred to Denizlispor in Turkey. He made his professional debut as a late sub with Denizlispor in a 6–2 Süper Lig loss to Kayserispor on 28 April 2021.

International career
Can was born in Germany and is of Turkish descent. He represented the Germany U16s and Germany U17s before switching to represent Turkey. In 2019, he was capped by the Turkey U19s and Turkey U20s.

References

External links
 
 
 
 

2000 births
Living people
German people of Turkish descent
Sportspeople from Gelsenkirchen
Turkish footballers
German footballers
Association football defenders
Turkey youth international footballers
Germany youth international footballers
Regionalliga players
Süper Lig players
FC Schalke 04 II players
FC Groningen players
Denizlispor footballers
Turkish expatriate footballers
German expatriate footballers
Turkish expatriate sportspeople in the Netherlands
German expatriate sportspeople in the Netherlands
Expatriate footballers in the Netherlands
Footballers from North Rhine-Westphalia